Gălășeni is a commune in Rîșcani District, Moldova. It is composed of two villages, Gălășeni and Mălăiești.

References

Communes of Rîșcani District